Parc Phœnix is a  botanical garden and zoo in Nice, Alpes-Maritimes, France.

Location and history

The park was opened in February 1990, and is located at the southwestern edge of Nice, in the l'Arenas district, along the Promenade des Anglais. The park has an inner body of water. The park is divided into several zones, such as a tropical zone, a Mediterranean garden, and areas reserved for animals.

Exterior gardens

The park consists mostly of a large greenhouse with a large pool, hosting animals such as pelicans, swans, ducks and turtles. Other animals living in the park live in cages.

The greenhouse

Temporary expositions
The park regularly hosts temporary expositions about nature.

Notes

External links
 
 

Buildings and structures in Nice
Botanical gardens in France
Zoos in France
Gardens in Alpes-Maritimes
Tourist attractions in Nice
1990 establishments in France
Zoos established in 1990
Organizations based in Nice